The inaugural men's 50-metre freestyle event at the 1988 Summer Olympics took place on 24 September at the Jamsil Indoor Swimming Pool in Seoul, South Korea.

U.S. swimmer Matt Biondi demolished a new world record to become the event's first ever Olympic champion. He threw down a scorching time in 22.14 to add a fourth gold and sixth medal to his Olympic hardware, and to slice 0.04 seconds off the record set by South Africa's Peter Williams. Starting the race with a fastest reaction, Biondi's rival and teammate Tom Jager faded down the stretch to pick up the silver in 22.36. Meanwhile, Soviet Union's Gennadiy Prigoda edged out Swiss swimmer Dano Halsall by 12-hundredths of a second to take home the bronze in 22.71.

Records
Prior to this competition, the existing world and Olympic records were as follows.

The following records were established during the competition:

Competition format

The competition consisted of two rounds: heats and finals. The swimmers with the best 8 times in the heats advanced to final A, where they competed for the top 8 places. The swimmers with the next 8 times in the heats swam in final B, for ninth through the sixteenth place. Swim-offs were used as necessary to determine advancement.

Results

Heats
Rule: The eight fastest swimmers advance to final A, while the next eight to final B.

Swimoff

Finals

Final B

Final A

References

External links
 Official Report
 USA Swimming

Swimming at the 1988 Summer Olympics
Men's events at the 1988 Summer Olympics